Håkan Larsson can refer to:

 Håkan Larsson (cyclist) (born 1958), Swedish cyclist
 Håkan Larsson (politician) (born 1950), Swedish politician